Kathirukka Neramillai is a 1993 Indian Tamil language action thriller film directed by Kulothungan, starring Karthik, Sivaranjani and Khushbu.

Plot 
Raju and his sidekicks stole black money to help an orphanage. D.I.G. Mohanraj (Rajesh) knew that they are thieves, but he was unable to send them in jail. Raju and Radhika, Mohanraj's daughter, fell in love. Her father refuses to accept it, so he arranged a marriage with Ajith (Uday Prakash), a police officer. Raju became drunk and killed Ajith. When Mohanraj came back to his car, he found Raju drunk at the backseat. Raju's lookalike said his flashback. His name was Somasekhar, and he fell in love with Bhavani (Khushbu) and married her. She worked at Chatterjee's (Nassar) ganja estate. Chatterjee wanted Somasekhar's estate, but the latter did not want to sell it to a criminal. Chatterjee's henchmen killed Bhavani, who gave birth to a girl. Somasekhar, wounded, could not do anything. A few years later, Ajith kidnapped his daughter. Somasekhar, after telling the flashback, reveals to Raju that he still will kill two people as Raju. Somasekhar went to his daughter's nanny's home, who also worked for Chatterjee, as she and Raju asked him to be Somasekhar for some days. Raju's lover and friends came to see him, but Somasekhar advised them to go to a place, so they went there, and Somasekhar's friend kidnapped them like Raju. Finally, they managed to escape. Somasekhar found where his child was kidnapped. Chatterjee caught Raju and Somasekhar. Somasekhar revealed that he gave his property and his daughter to Raju. Somasekhar killed Chatterjee and died.

Cast 
Karthik as Raju and Somasekhar
Sivaranjani as Radhika
Khushbu as Bhavani
Nassar as Chatterjee
Rajesh as D.I.G. Mohanraj
Chinni Jayanth as Raju's friend
Vadivelu as Raju's friend
Thyagu as Raju's friend
Uday Prakash as Ajith

Production 
Kaathirukka Neramillai was the directorial debut of Kulothungan. The film's story was written by Karthik's brother Ganesh.

Soundtrack 
The soundtrack was composed by Ilaiyaraaja, with lyrics written by Vaali and Pulamaipithan.

Reception 
The Indian Express wrote, "What begins as an average film soon turns into a fairly engaging one mainly due to the neat screenplay in the second half and absence of the boring moments". New Straits Times wrote "Though it is reminiscent of Gentleman, the first half was at least easy to sit through with its light humour [..] The second half gets too serious and it is like sitting  through another of those movies we have seen so often of the bad guys chasing the good guys".

References

External links 

1990s Tamil-language films
1993 action thriller films
1993 directorial debut films
1993 films
Films scored by Ilaiyaraaja
Indian action thriller films